Richard Martin (born October 5, 1962 in Avignon, France) is a former professional footballer who played as a striker.

External links
Richard Martin profile at chamoisfc79.fr

1962 births
Living people
French footballers
Sportspeople from Avignon
Association football forwards
FC Martigues players
Chamois Niortais F.C. players
Ligue 2 players
AC Avignonnais players